A Lyman-alpha emitter (LAE) is a type of distant galaxy that emits Lyman-alpha radiation from neutral hydrogen.

Most known LAEs are extremely distant, and because of the finite travel time of light they provide glimpses into the history of the universe. They are thought to be the progenitors of most modern Milky Way type galaxies.  These galaxies can be found nowadays rather easily in narrow-band searches by an excess of their narrow-band flux at a wavelength which may be interpreted from their redshift:

where z is the redshift,  is the observed wavelength, and 1215.67 Å is the wavelength of Lyman-alpha emission.  The Lyman-alpha line in most LAEs is thought to be caused by recombination of interstellar hydrogen that is ionized by an ongoing burst of star formation.  Such Lyman alpha emission was first suggested as a signature of young galaxies by Bruce Partridge and P. J. E. Peebles in 1967.   Experimental observations of the redshift of LAEs are important in cosmology because they trace dark matter halos and subsequently the evolution of matter distribution in the universe.

Properties 
Lyman-alpha emitters are typically low mass galaxies of 108 to 1010 solar masses. They are typically young galaxies that are 200 to 600 million years old, and they have the highest specific star formation rate of any galaxies known. All of these properties indicate that Lyman-alpha emitters are important clues as to the progenitors of modern Milky Way type galaxies.

Lyman-alpha emitters have many unknown properties.  The Lyman-alpha photon escape fraction varies greatly in these galaxies. This is what portion of the light emitted at the Lyman-alpha line wavelength inside the galaxy actually escapes and will be visible to distant observers. There is much evidence that the dust content of these galaxies could be significant and therefore is obscuring the brightness of these galaxies. It is also possible that anisotropic distribution of hydrogen density and velocity play a significant role in the varying escape fraction due to the photons' continued interaction with the hydrogen gas (radiative transfer).  Evidence now shows strong evolution in the Lyman-alpha escape fraction with redshift, most likely associated with the buildup of dust in the ISM. Dust is shown to be the main parameter setting the escape of Lyman-alpha photons.  Additionally the metallicity, outflows, and detailed evolution with redshift is unknown.

Importance in cosmology 
LAEs are important probes of reionization, cosmology (BAO), and they allow probing of the faint end of the luminosity function at high redshift.

The baryonic acoustic oscillation signal should be evident in the power spectrum of Lyman-alpha emitters at high redshift. Baryonic acoustic oscillations are imprints of sound waves on scales where radiation pressure stabilized the density perturbations against gravitational collapse in the early universe. The three-dimensional distribution of the characteristically homogeneous Lyman-alpha galaxy population will allow a robust probe of cosmology. They are a good tool because the Lyman-alpha bias, the propensity for galaxies to form in the highest overdensity of the underlying dark matter distribution, can be modeled and accounted for.  Lyman-alpha emitters are over dense in clusters.

See also 
 Damped Lyman-alpha system
 Lyman-alpha blob
 Lyman-alpha forest
 Lyman-break galaxy
 Lyman limit
 Lyman series

References

External links 

 

Physical cosmology
Galaxies